The skipjack tuna (Katsuwonus pelamis) is a medium-sized perciform fish in the tuna family, Scombridae. It is otherwise known as the balaya (Sri Lanka), bakulan/kayu (North Borneo), tongkol/aya (Malay Peninsula/Indonesia), aku (Hawaii), cakalang (Indonesia), katsuo, arctic bonito, mushmouth, oceanic bonito, striped tuna or victor fish. It grows up to 1 m (3 ft) in length. It is a cosmopolitan pelagic fish found in tropical and warm-temperate waters. It is a very important species for fisheries.

Description

It is a streamlined, fast-swimming pelagic fish, common in tropical waters throughout the world, where it inhabits surface waters in large shoals (up to 50,000 fish), feeding on fish, crustaceans, cephalopods, and mollusks. It is an important prey species for sharks and large pelagic fishes and is often used as live bait when fishing for marlin. It has no scales, except on the lateral line and the corselet (a band of large, thick scales forming a circle around the body behind the head). Determining the age of skipjack tuna is difficult, and the estimates of its potential lifespan range between 8 and 12 years.

Skipjack tuna is a batch spawner. Spawning occurs year-round in equatorial waters, but it gets more seasonal further away from the equator. It is also known for its potent smell.

Skipjack tuna have the highest percentage of skeletal muscle devoted to locomotion of all animals, with 68% of the animal's total body mass.

Skipjack tuna are highly sensitive to environmental conditions and changes. Climate change effects are significant in marine ecosystems, and ecological factors may change fish distribution and catchability.

Fisheries

It is an important commercial and game fish, usually caught using purse seine nets, and is sold fresh, frozen, canned, dried, salted, and smoked. In 2018, landings of 3.2 million tonnes were reported, the third highest of any marine capture fishery (after Peruvian anchoveta and Alaska pollock).
Countries recording large amounts of skipjack catches include the Maldives, France, Spain, Malaysia, Sri Lanka, and Indonesia.

Skipjack is the most fecund of the main commercial tunas, and its population is considered sustainable against its current consumption. Its fishing is still controversial due to the methodology, with rod and reel or fishery options being promoted as ecologically preferable. 
Purse seine methods are considered unsustainable by some authorities due to excess bycatch, although bycatch is said to be much reduced if fish aggregation devices are not used. These considerations have led to the availability of canned skipjack marked with the fishing method used to catch it.

Skipjack is considered to have "moderate" mercury contamination. As a result, pregnant women are advised against eating large quantities. In addition, skipjack's livers were tested globally for tributyltin (TBT) contamination. TBT is an organotin compound introduced into marine ecosystems through antifouling paint used on ship hulls, and has been determined to be very toxic. About 90% of skipjack tested positive for contamination, especially in Southeast Asia, where regulations of TBT use are less rigorous than in Europe or the US.

As food
Besides being eaten seared and raw in sushi and sashimi, it is also smoked and dried to make katsuobushi, the central ingredient in dashi (a common Japanese fish stock). It is also a key ingredient in shuto.

In Indonesian cuisine, skipjack tuna is known as cakalang. The most popular Indonesian dish made from skipjack tuna is cakalang fufu from Minahasa. It is a cured and smoked skipjack tuna dish, made by cooking the fish after clipping it to a bamboo frame. Skipjack known as kalhubilamas in Maldives is integral to Maldivian cuisine.

Skipjack tuna is an important fish in the native cuisine of Hawaii (where it is known as aku) and throughout the Pacific islands. Hawaiians prefer to eat aku either raw as a sashimi or poke or seared in Japanese tataki style.

The trade in pickled skipjack tuna is a driving force behind the commercial fishery of this species in Spain.

References

Citations

Sources 
 Pacific skipjack tuna NOAA FishWatch. Retrieved 5 November 2012.
 Western Atlantic skipjack tuna NOAA FishWatch. Retrieved 5 November 2012.

External links 
 
 

skipjack tuna
Scombridae
Monotypic fish genera
Commercial fish
Cosmopolitan fish
Sport fish
skipjack tuna
Taxa named by Carl Linnaeus

na:Eae